Hasan Nuran (also Romanized as Ḩasan Nūrān; also known as Ḩasanlī, Ḩasanlū, Hasan Tūrān, and Khassan) is a village in Oshnavieh-ye Shomali Rural District, in the Central District of Oshnavieh County, West Azerbaijan Province, Iran. At the 2006 census, its population was 614, in 131 families.

References 

Populated places in Oshnavieh County